Primorsky station is a former railway terminal in St. Petersburg, Russia. It was constructed by the JSC Primorskaya Saint Peterburg–Sestroretsk railway and was opened on July, 23rd 1893 as part of the Ozerki Line.

The station was closed on 23 September 1924, during the catastrophic flooding and it was never restored. In 1925, the passenger traffic was redirected through the Tovarnaya Line to Finland Station, via Flugov post and Baburin post.

References

Railway stations closed in 1924
Railway stations in Saint Petersburg
Railway stations in the Russian Empire opened in 1893